Mantou's riflebird, also known as Bruijn's riflebird, is a bird in the family Paradisaeidae that is presumed to be an intergeneric hybrid between a twelve-wired bird-of-paradise and magnificent riflebird.

History
At least 12 adult male specimens are known of this hybrid, held in various museums and of unknown provenance except one from the Arfak Mountains of north-western New Guinea.

Notes

References
 

Hybrid birds of paradise
Birds of New Guinea
Intergeneric hybrids